Outside the Box is the debut studio album by British rap metal band Hacktivist. It was released on 4 March 2016 through UNFD and Rise Records.

Music videos for the songs "Elevate", "False Idols", "Deceive and Defy", "Buszy" and "Taken" were released in support of the album. The album version of "Deceive and Defy" contains new vocals by Josh Graham of Heart of a Coward, after accusations of sexual misconduct were raised against Charlie Holmes, who had previously contributed vocals to the song on the single release.

On 1 March 2016, a playlist of the full album was uploaded to YouTube through Hacktivist's label UNFD.

Reception
The album generally received positive reviews, one of which described the album as "their best work yet".

Track listing

Personnel
 Jermaine "J" Hurley – rapped vocals
 Ben Marvin – rapped vocals, unclean vocals
 Tim "Timfy" James Beazley – guitars, clean vocals, programming
 Josh Gurner – bass
 Richard Hawking – drums

Trivia

The song "Buszy" is a reference to the world famous skate plaza The Buszy in Milton Keynes where J would skateboard and perform at jams and events, often by freestyle rapping.

References

Rise Records albums
Hacktivist (band) albums
2016 debut albums